Neil Eckersley (born 5 April 1964) is a retired judoka from the United Kingdom, who represented his nGreat Britain at the 1984 Summer Olympics in Los Angeles, California. There he won the bronze medal in the men's extra-lightweight division (– 60 kg), alongside USA's Edward "Ed" Liddie

Judo career
In 1986, he won the silver medal in the 60kg weight category at the judo demonstration sport event as part of the 1986 Commonwealth Games.

Bronze Olympic medallist. Olympic British team captain. European medallist. Placed seventh at the world Championships. Winning a bronze medal in the light-weight division (-60 kg) of the 1987 Matsutarō Shoriki cup in Tokyo likely made Eckersley to become the first British male judoka to win a medal during a major international tournament held in Japan. Since December 2014 Eckersley has held the rank of 7th dan awarded by the British Judo Association and International judo Federation. Eckersley holds a Diploma in Sports Coaching from Herriott Watt University in Edinburgh, and in 2005 completed a Bachelor of Arts (Hon.) degree in Sports Studies at St. Martins College, Lancaster, today known as the University of Cumbria. IJF 7 Dan

Eckersley is a judo instructor and from 2014 he has been head of the regional program in Judoregion West in Norway and club coach in Sandnes Judo Club.

Eckersley is a painter and digital artist and member of Art of the Olympians (AOTO).

References

 Profile

British male judoka
Judoka at the 1984 Summer Olympics
Judoka at the 1988 Summer Olympics
Olympic judoka of Great Britain
Olympic bronze medallists for Great Britain
1964 births
Living people
Place of birth missing (living people)
Olympic medalists in judo
Medalists at the 1984 Summer Olympics